Laurie Bell may refer to:

 Laurie Bell (footballer) (born 1992), English footballer
 Laurie Bell (Scottish footballer) (1875–1933), Scottish footballer

See also
Lawrence Bell (disambiguation)
Larry Bell (disambiguation)
Lurrie Bell (born 1958), American musician